Longtou is a town in Baoqing County, in southeastern Heilongjiang province, China. , it has 10 villages under its administration.

See also 
 List of township-level divisions of Heilongjiang

References 

Township-level divisions of Heilongjiang
Baoqing County